Andrew Laurence Houts (June 23, 1965 – February 26, 1997) was an American actor. Houts began his career at Klasky-Csupo, working on The Simpsons, Rugrats (where he wrote two episodes), Duckman and Aaahh!!! Real Monsters in numerous capacities (most commonly as a production coordinator and an actor). He also wrote one episode of Rocko's Modern Life, and appeared on The Drew Carey Show and Ellen in small roles. Houts died in 1997 of cardiac arrest caused by pulmonary embolism before the new season of Rugrats began. The episode "Radio Daze / Psycho Angelica" is dedicated to his memory. He was a gifted comic.

Filmography

References

External links

1965 births
1997 deaths
American male voice actors
20th-century American male actors
20th-century American screenwriters